Joel Penny (born 22 January 1980) is an Australian former professional rugby league footballer who played as a .

Playing career
Penny is a Kincumber Colts junior on the Central Coast. 
Penny made his first grade debut for the now defunct Northern Eagles.  In 2002, Penny joined South Sydney and played 2 games for the club.  In 2006, Penny moved to England and played for Halifax.  Penny then moved from National League One rivals Doncaster Lakers after their financial troubles.  Penny played for the Widnes Vikings in National League One.  Penny was a revelation with Widnes, and in 2007 scoring six tries in just seven games. Penny also was a member of the victorious Central Coast over 30s Touch Football team at the 2020 State Cup.

References

External links
 Widnes Profile

Rugby league players from Sydney
Australian rugby league players
Living people
Northern Eagles players
South Sydney Rabbitohs players
Whitehaven R.L.F.C. players
Halifax R.L.F.C. players
Doncaster R.L.F.C. players
Widnes Vikings players
1980 births
Rugby league halfbacks